The Vermont Library Association (VLA) is a professional organization for Vermont's librarians and library workers. It was founded in 1893 and is headquartered in Burlington, Vermont. VLA has approximately 400 members including public, academic, special, and school librarians, library trustees, and library friends. VLA co-sponsors an annual conference in May with the Vermont School Library Association and publishes a bi-monthly newsletter VLA News.

References

External links
 Vermont Library Association website
 New England Library Association website

Library associations in the United States
Organizations based in Burlington, Vermont